The Marcomannic Wars (Latin: bellum Germanicum et Sarmaticum, "German and Sarmatian War") were a series of wars lasting from about 166 until 180 AD. These wars pitted the Roman Empire against, principally, the Germanic Marcomanni and Quadi and the Sarmatian Iazyges; there were related conflicts with several other Germanic, Sarmatian and Gothic peoples along both sides of the whole length of the Roman Empire's northeastern European border, the river Danube.

The struggle against the Germans and Sarmatians occupied the major part of the reign of Roman emperor Marcus Aurelius, and it was during his campaigns against them that he started writing his philosophical work Meditations.

Background
Secure for many years following his ascension to power, the Roman Emperor Antoninus Pius never left Italy; neither did he embark on substantial conquests, all the while allowing his provincial legates to command his legions entirely. Historian Adrian Goldsworthy posits that Pius's reluctance to take aggressive military action throughout his reign may have contributed to Parthian territorial ambitions. The resulting war between Parthia and Rome lasted from 161 to 166 AD (under the joint rule of Marcus Aurelius and Lucius Verus) and, although it ended successfully, its unforeseen consequences for the Empire were great. The returning troops brought with them a plague (the so-called Antonine Plague), which would eventually kill an estimated 7 to 8 million people, severely weakening the Empire. Despite the consequences of the plague, historian Kyle Harper contends that the event should not be treated as a fatal blow to the Empire. Instead, Rome's resilience was demonstrated since the Empire remained intact and Roman birth rates in the decade following the plague subsequently increased.

At the same time, in Central Europe during the second-century AD, the first movements of the Great Migrations were occurring, as the Goths began moving south-east from their ancestral lands at the mouth of River Vistula (see Wielbark culture), putting pressure on the Germanic tribes from the north and east. As a result, Germanic tribes and other nomadic peoples launched raids south and west across Rome's northern border, particularly into Gaul and across the Danube. Whether this sudden influx of peoples with which Marcus Aurelius had to contend was the result of climate change or overpopulation remains unknown. Theories exist that the various Germanic tribes along the periphery of the Empire may have conspired to test Roman resolve as part of an attempt to bring to possible fruition, Arminius's dream of a future united Germanic empire. Up until these subsequent wars, the Marcomanni and Quadi generally enjoyed amicable relations and access to the Empire's wares—archaeological evidence of Roman household goods and practices illustrate such contact. As with almost all areas within the Empire's reach, the Romans aimed for a combination of military-territorial dominance, while at the same time, engaging in mutually beneficial commerce.

First Marcomannic War

First invasions
By the reign of Emperor Marcus Aurelius in 161 AD, the pressures along the Roman frontier had reached a critical point as the Germanic tribes along its borders at the Rhine and Danube came to the conclusion that their survival meant breaking into Rome's territories. Beginning in 162 and continuing until 165, an invasion of Chatti and Chauci in the provinces of Raetia and Germania Superior was repulsed. In late 166 or early 167, a force of 6,000 Langobardi and Lacringi invaded Pannonia. This invasion was defeated by local forces (vexillations of the Legio I Adiutrix commanded by a certain Candidus and the Ala Ulpia contariorum commanded by Vindex) with relative ease, but they marked the beginning of what was to come. In their aftermath, the military governor of Pannonia, Marcus Iallius Bassus, initiated negotiations with 11 tribes. In these negotiations, the Marcomannic king Ballomar, a Roman client, acted as a mediator. In the event, a truce was agreed upon and the tribes withdrew from Roman territory, but no permanent agreement was reached. In the same year, Vandals (Astingi and Lacringi) and the Sarmatian Iazyges invaded Dacia, and succeeded in killing its governor, Calpurnius Proculus. To counter them, Legio V Macedonica, a veteran unit of the Parthian campaign, was moved from Moesia Inferior to Dacia Superior, closer to the enemy.

First Roman expedition in Pannonia (168)
During that time, as the Antonine plague was ravaging the empire, Marcus Aurelius was unable to do more, and the punitive expedition he was planning to lead in person was postponed until 168. In the spring of that year, Marcus Aurelius, together with Lucius Verus, set forth from Rome, and established their headquarters at Aquileia. The two emperors supervised a reorganization of the defences of Italy and the Illyricum, raised two new legions, Legio II Italica and Legio III Italica, and crossed the Alps into Pannonia. The Marcomanni and the Victuali had crossed the Danube into the province, but, at least according to the Historia Augusta, the approach of the imperial army to Carnuntum was apparently sufficient to persuade them to withdraw and offer assurances of good conduct. The two emperors returned to Aquileia for the winter, but on the way, in January 169, Lucius Verus died. Marcus returned to Rome to oversee his co-emperor's funeral.

Roman expedition against the Iazyges and the Germanic invasion of Italy
In the autumn of 169, Marcus set out from Rome, together with his son-in-law Claudius Pompeianus, who would become his closest aide during the war. The Romans had gathered their forces and intended to subdue the independent tribes (especially the Iazyges), who lived between the Danube and the Roman province of Dacia. The Iazyges defeated and killed Marcus Claudius Fronto, Roman governor of Lower Moesia. However, while the Roman army was entangled in this campaign, making little headway, several tribes used the opportunity to cross the frontier and raid Roman territory.

To the east, the Costoboci crossed the Danube, ravaged Thrace and descended into the Balkans, reaching Eleusis, near Athens, where they destroyed the temple of the Eleusinian Mysteries.

The most important and dangerous invasion, however, was that of the Marcomanni in the west. Their leader, Ballomar, had formed a coalition of Germanic tribes. They crossed the Danube and won a decisive victory over a force of 20,000 Roman soldiers near Carnuntum, in what is sometimes known the Battle of Carnuntum. Ballomar then led the larger part of his host southwards towards Italy, while the remainder ravaged Noricum. The Marcomanni razed Opitergium (Oderzo) and besieged Aquileia. This was the first time that hostile forces had entered Italy since 101 BC, when Gaius Marius defeated the Cimbri. The army of praetorian prefect Titus Furius Victorinus tried to relieve the city, but was defeated and possibly killed during the battle (other sources have him die of the plague).

There is no consensus amongst scholars as to the year that the great Germanic invasion towards Aquileia took place. Several authors, like Marcus Aurelius' biographer Frank McLynn, accepting the date of defeat near Carnuntum as 170, place the great Germanic invasion itself three years earlier. They maintain it happened in 167 because by the year 170 the Germans would have been checked by the Praetentura Italiae et Alpium—the fortifications which were erected in 168–169 to block a breakthrough of the Alps to Northern Italy – whereas all sources confirm it to be a military walkover. A further argument is that the panic which gripped Rome in 167–168 would make no sense if the Germanic tribes were still on the opposite side of the Danube. Also, no source mentions the emperor being near the front when the disaster occurred, whereas by 170 Marcus Aurelius had settled there. McLynn maintains that Marcus Aurelius and Lucius Verus went to Aquileia in 168 to restore morale after the disaster as Aquileia makes no geographical, logistical or military sense as a base of operations for launching a campaign on the Danube in Pannonia. The reason McLynn maintains that 170 is proposed by other authors is that too much weight is given to Lucian's testimony regarding the influence of Alexander of Abonoteichos as a scapegoat for the disaster whereas it is uncertain whether Alexander was still alive by 170 and Lucian's chronology is at certain points suspect.

Deviating from the above discussion in English literature, researchers in Slovenia, one of the regions affected by the Germanic invasion, accept the year 168 as the proper date, based, among other arguments, on a portrait of Lucius Verus found in Ptuj.

Roman counter-offensive and defeat of the Marcomanni

This disaster forced Marcus to re-evaluate his priorities. Forces from the various frontiers were dispatched against Ballomar. They came under the command of Claudius Pompeianus, with the future emperor Pertinax as one of his lieutenants. A new military command, the praetentura Italiae et Alpium was established to safeguard the roads into Italy, and the Danubian fleet was strengthened. Aquileia was relieved, and by the end of 171, the invaders had been evicted from Roman territory. Intense diplomatic activity followed, as the Romans tried to win over various barbarian tribes in preparation for a crossing of the Danube. A peace treaty was signed with the Quadi and the Iazyges, while the tribes of the Hasdingi Vandals and the Lacringi became Roman allies.

In 172, the Romans crossed the Danube into Marcomannic territory. Although few details are known, the Romans achieved success, subjugating the Marcomanni and their allies, the Varistae or Naristi and the Cotini. This fact is evident from the adoption of the title "Germanicus" by Marcus Aurelius, and the minting of coins with the inscription "Germania capta" ("subjugated Germania"). During this campaign, the chief of the Naristi was killed by the Roman General Marcus Valerius Maximianus.

In 173, the Romans campaigned against the Quadi, who had broken their treaty and assisted their kin, and defeated and subdued them. During this campaign, a famous incident, the so-called "miracle of the rain", occurred, which was later depicted on the column of Marcus Aurelius and on coins. According to Cassius Dio, the legio XII Fulminata was hemmed in by a superior Quadi force and almost forced to surrender because of the heat and thirst. They were saved, however, by a sudden shower, which refreshed the Romans, while lightning struck the Quadi. Contemporaries and historians attributed it to divine intervention: Dio stated that it was called by an Egyptian magician praying to Mercury, while Christian writers such as Tertullian attributed it to a prayer by Christians.

In the same year, Didius Iulianus, the commander of the Rhine frontier, repelled another invasion of the Chatti and the Hermunduri, while the Chauci raided the shoreline of Gallia Belgica.

In the next year, the Romans marched against the Quadi, whereupon the Quadi deposed their pro-Roman king, Furtius, and installed his rival, Ariogaesus, in his place. Marcus Aurelius refused to recognize him, and turning back, deposed and exiled him to Alexandria. Thus, by late 174, the subjugation of the Quadi was complete. In typical Roman fashion, they were forced to surrender hostages and provide auxiliary contingents for the Roman army, while garrisons were installed throughout their territory.

After this, the Romans focused their attention on the Iazyges living in the plain of the river Tisza (expeditio sarmatica). After a few victories, in 175, a treaty was signed. According to its terms, the Iazyges King Zanticus delivered 100,000 Roman prisoners and, in addition, provided 8,000 auxiliary cavalrymen, most of whom (5,500) were sent to Britain. Upon this, Marcus assumed the victory title "Sarmaticus".

Marcus Aurelius may have intended to campaign against the remaining tribes, and together with his recent conquests establish two new Roman provinces, Marcomannia and Sarmatia, but whatever his plans, they were cut short by the rebellion of Avidius Cassius in the East.

Marcus Aurelius marched eastwards with his army, accompanied by auxiliary detachments of Marcomanni, Quadi and Naristi under the command of Marcus Valerius Maximianus. After the successful suppression of Cassius' revolt, the emperor returned to Rome for the first time in nearly 8 years. On 23 December 176, together with his son Commodus, he celebrated a joint triumph for his German victories ("de Germanis" and "de Sarmatis"). In commemoration of this, the Aurelian Column was erected, in imitation of Trajan's Column.

Second Marcomannic War

The victory celebrations of the previous year were but a brief respite for in 177 A.D. the Quadi rebelled, followed soon by their neighbours, the Marcomanni. Marcus Aurelius once again headed north to begin his second Germanic campaign (secunda expeditio germanica). He arrived at Carnuntum in August 178 and set out to quell the rebellion in a repeat of his first campaign, moving first against the Marcomanni and against the Quadi between 179 and 180 A.D. Under the command of Marcus Valerius Maximianus, the Romans fought and prevailed against the Quadi in a decisive battle at Laugaricio (near modern Trenčín, Slovakia). The Quadi were chased  deeper into Greater Germania westwards, where the praetorian prefect Publius Tarrutenius Paternus later achieved another decisive victory against them, but on 17 March 180, Marcus Aurelius died at Vindobona (modern Vienna).

His son and successor, Commodus, had little interest in pursuing the war after his father's death. Against the advice of his senior generals, Commodus negotiated a peace treaty with the Marcomanni and the Quadi. He then left for Rome in early autumn 180 A.D., where he celebrated a triumph on October 22.

Third Marcomannic War 
Operations continued against the Iazyges, the Buri and the so-called "free Dacians" living between the Danube and Roman Dacia. Not much is known about this war, except that the Roman generals included Marcus Valerius Maximianus, Pescennius Niger and Clodius Albinus. At any rate, the victories they achieved were deemed sufficient for Emperor Commodus to claim the victory title "Germanicus Maximus" in mid-182.
An inscription (CIL III 5937) describes a campaign against the Germanic tribe of the Lugii or Burii (Expeditio Burica).

Aftermath

The wars had exposed the weakness of Rome's northern frontier, and henceforth, half of the Roman legions (16 out of 33) would be stationed along the Danube and the Rhine. Numerous Germans settled in frontier regions like Dacia, Pannonia, Germany and Italy itself. This was not a new occurrence, but this time the numbers of settlers required the creation of two new frontier provinces on the left shore of the Danube, Sarmatia and Marcomannia, including today's Czech Republic and Slovakia. Some Germans who settled in Ravenna revolted and managed to seize possession of the city. For this reason, Marcus Aurelius decided not to bring more barbarians into Italy, but even banished those who had previously been brought there. The Germanic tribes were temporarily checked, but the Marcomannic Wars were only the prelude of the invasions that would eventually disassemble and end the Western Roman Empire in the 4th and 5th centuries.

In popular culture
 Two films, The Fall of the Roman Empire (1964) and Gladiator (2000), open with a fictionalized portrayal of a final battle of the Marcomannic Wars.

Maps
Key: Red arrows: Romans. Green arrows: Marcomanns. Italy and Adriatic Sea at bottom left corner.
First Marcomannic war

Second Marcomannic war

References

Notes

Citations

Bibliography

 
 Cassius Dio, Historia romana, Books LXXII & LXXIII
 
 
 Historia Augusta, The. Lives of Marcus Aurelius. 1 & 2, Lucius Verus and Commodus (Loeb Classical Library edition).
 
 Herodian, History of the Roman Empire since the Death of Marcus Aurelius, Book I, Ch. 1–6
 
 
 Robertson, Donald. How to Think Like a Roman Emperor: The Stoic Philosophy of Marcus Aurelius. New York: St. Martin's Press, 2019.

External links

  Marco Aurelio y la frontera del Danubio
 Marcus Aurelius and Barbarian Immigration in the Second Century Roman Empire
 The Marcomannic Wars

160s conflicts
170s conflicts
160s in the Roman Empire
170s in the Roman Empire
180s in the Roman Empire
Battles involving the Suebi
Battles of antiquity
Wars
Quadi
Wars involving Germanic peoples
Wars involving the Roman Empire
Wars involving the Sarmatians